Louis V. Mato (July 20, 1903 – June 9, 1989) was an American politician and businessman.

Born in Pogradec then part of the Ottoman Empire, Mato went to school in Albania. He went to business school in Red Wing, Minnesota. Mato lived in Fairchild, Wisconsin. He sold chef supplies and owned a restaurant. He served on the Eau Claire County, Wisconsin Board of Supervisors and was the vice chairman. From 1963 to 1971, he served in the Wisconsin State Assembly and was a Democrat.

Notes

External links

1903 births
1989 deaths
People from Fairchild, Wisconsin
Albanian emigrants to the United States
Businesspeople from Wisconsin
County supervisors in Wisconsin
People from Pogradec
20th-century American businesspeople
20th-century American politicians
Democratic Party members of the Wisconsin State Assembly